Bond Bridge is a Wi-Fi device that communicates with infra-red  controlled devices, such as ceiling fans, shades, and fireplaces.  

Broadlink MR4 is a competing product.

References

Computer networking